Just Because may refer to:

Albums
 Just Because, by the Peninsula Banjo Band, 1976
 Just Because (album), by The Belle Brigade, 2014

Songs
 "Just Because" (Ginuwine song), 2001
 "Just Because" (Jane's Addiction song), 2003
 "Just Because" (Nelstone's Hawaiians song), 1929; covered by Frankie Yankovic, Elvis Presley, and others
 "Just Because", by Anita Baker from Giving You the Best That I Got
 "Just Because", by Baek A-yeon
 "Just Because", by Chad Brownlee from The Fighters
 "Just Because", by Dido from Still on My Mind
 "Just Because", by F.A.T.E. from the Deep Blue Sea soundtrack album
 "Just Because", by Funeral Party from The Golden Age of Knowhere
 "Just Because", by Joyner Lucas from 508-507-2209
 "Just Because", by Lloyd Price, 1956
 "Just Because", by War from Outlaw

Other uses
 Just Because!, a 2017 Japanese anime television series
 Just Because (musical), a 1922 American musical
 Just Because, a 2014 concert tour by Trisha Yearwood
 Just Because, Inc., former owner of radio station WQVR in Massachusetts, US

See also 
 Just Cause (disambiguation)